Osaka Dojima Commodity Exchange (ODEX) is a futures exchange  based in Osaka, Japan. It started as the Osaka Grain Exchange in 1952. In 1993 it merged with the Osaka Sugar Exchange and the Kobe Grain Exchange, taking the name Kansai Agricultural Commodities Exchange. The exchange merged with the Kobe Raw Silk Exchange in 1997, becoming the Kansai Commodities Exchange (KEX), and with the Fukuoka Commodities Exchange in 2006. In February 2013 it took over the rice exchange from the Tokyo Grain Exchange and took its current name.

Trading is conducted at six specified session times through the day. Commodities traded are

 Azuki (red beans) — grade 2 produced in Hokkaidō, other grades or origins at a discount
 Coffee index — cash settled average of arabica and robusta on the Tokyo Grain Exchange
 Corn 75 index — cash settled average price of corn at Tokyo Grain Exchange, Fukuoka Futures Exchange and Chicago Board of Trade and soybean meal at Chicago Board of Trade
 Frozen shrimp — frozen raw headless shell-on black tiger prawns for delivery at Osaka or Kobe
 IOM soybeans (possibly GMO)
 Non-GMO soybeans — identity-preserved number 2 yellow soybeans of certain United States states origin, delivered in Japan
 Raw silk — 27 denier 3A produced in Japan, delivered to Kobe or Yokohama
 Raw sugar — from various countries of origin, delivery at various Japanese ports
 Rice

See also
 Osaka Exchange
 Tokyo Commodity Exchange
 Dōjima Rice Exchange
 List of futures exchanges
 List of commodities exchanges

References 

Companies based in Osaka Prefecture
Commodity exchanges